Theeradha Vilaiyattu Pillai is a 2010 Indian Tamil-language romantic comedy film written and directed by Thiru. The film, produced by Vikram Krishna. Starring Vishal in the lead role along with Sarah-Jane Dias who makes her acting debut. while, Tanushree Dutta and Neetu Chandra making her debut in Tamil cinema Santhanam, Sathyan, Mayilsamy, and T. S. B. K. Mouli play supporting roles, while Sneha and Mallika Kapoor make special appearances and Prakash Raj in a guest role. The film was later dubbed into Hindi as Ek Khiladi 3 Hasina

The film follows the story of Karthik ( Vishal ), a happy-go-lucky youth and only child, who is also rich and spoilt. Karthik believes in trying out and choosing the best of everything in his life. When he decides to adopt the same practice in choosing his wife and selects three potential candidates of totally different shades and social stratifications, who he simultaneously woos, problems emerge and he gets into trouble. How he manages to overcome all problems and who he finally chooses to marry forms the crux of the story.

The film, featuring music scored by Yuvan Shankar Raja, cinematography by Arvind Krishna and editing by T. S. Suresh, was distributed by Sun Pictures on 12 February 2010.

The film was an inspiration for the 2019 Odia film Mr. Majnu starring Babushan. The background music was adapted from Rajinikanth's Netrikkann.

Plot 
Karthik is a lazy, jobless, upper middle-class guy and the only son of his father, who is a bank manager. Karthik is always hanging around with his friends: an autorickshaw driver Kumar, a tea shop owner Shekar, and a traffic constable Vishnu. Over-ambitious in his life, he always wants the best of everything in his life, from pens and clothes to every other accessories, and has made it a rule to try out everything before zeroing in on one. Now wanting to choose his best life partner, he applies the same method and decides to select three girls, whom he would romance at the same time and make to fall in love with him, then reject two of them and finally marry the third one.

Karthik comes across Jyothi, an athlete living in the poorer area of Chennai, who has reservations against men and slaps a guy for touching her inappropriately and is Karthik's first choice. Karthik later attends a marriage, where he meets Priya, a girl who strongly believes in traditional and cultural values and has the policy of loving and marrying only one boy in her life, and she is Karthik's second candidate. Karthik enters their lives, woos them with lies, and finally wins their hearts. The girls do not know the fact that Karthik is romancing three girls simultaneously and entirely trust him.

One day, thanks to her caring and understanding father Ranganathan, who does not want his daughter to sustain one more love failure, Tejaswini gets to know about Karthik's plans and intentions and confronts him. Karthik dumps her and continues to romance Jyothi and Priya, while Tejaswini vows to take revenge on him. Without revealing her own and Karthik's true identity and intentions, she befriends the other two girls and gives advice to each, how to quicken the progress to get married soon, trying to put Karthik under pressure and blow his cover. Soon Jyothi gets to know the truth, wherefore he also rejects Jyothi and settles down with Priya as his future wife, who was responsible for Karthik's change of mind as he has now learnt the value of true love and realizes his mistakes.

However, as Jyothi's rowdy brother Anbalazhagan confronts Karthik that he has betrayed Jyothi, Karthik reveals the truth about himself, his intentions, and the other girls to Priya, who was with him. Downheartedly, she leaves Karthik, who is being beaten up by Anbalazhagan and his gang. Karthik then causes a traffic accident, getting himself tangled and injured in the accident, and gets admitted in a hospital, where Dr. Ramya comes for his treatment. He pretends to have lost his memory due to the accident in order to arouse compassion in Priya and also with the intention to change his behavior to be more loyal to Priya, eventually indeed succeeding in his plan as Priya returns and reunites with him.

The film ends with Karthik breaks the fourth wall the audience about he plans to "live as a new man and love Priya only". The film ends with him asking, "You believe me, right?" to the audience, after which his future is left for the audience to predict.

Cast 

 Vishal as Karthik
 Sarah-Jane Dias as Priya
 Tanushree Dutta as Jyothi
 Neetu Chandra as Tejaswini Ranganathan
 Santhanam as Kumar
 Sathyan as Vishnu
 Mayilsamy as Shekar
 T. S. B. K. Mouli as Karthik's father
 Sudha as Karthik's mother
 Jayaprakash as Ranganathan
 Prakash Raj as Anbalazhagan (cameo appearance)
 Sneha as Dr. Ramya (cameo appearance)
 Mallika Kapoor as an Interviewer (cameo appearance)

Production

Development 
In February 2009, it was reported, that Thiru, who assisted director A. Rajasekhar in the 2008 police story Sathyam, that also starred Vishal Krishna would direct Vishal after the actor had completed his Thoranai. The film was to be produced by Ramesh Babu, who earlier produced Vijay's blockbuster film Pokkiri. However, as the producer later walked out of the project, Vishal's brother Vikram Krishna along with his wife Sriya Reddy eventually took up the project and decided to produce it under their home banner G K Film Corporation. The film was titled Theeratha Vilaiyattu Pillai, after a poem by Subramania Bharathi.

The film, during pre-production was billed up to be a remake of the 2007 Hindi film Bachna Ae Haseeno, which also starred three actresses in lead roles, but the claim proved to be false. Vishal also denied this, stating that the script is original. In January 2010, the film's distribution rights were acquired by Sun Pictures, which started its promotion campaign on 2 February 2010, ten days prior to the film's theatrical release.

Casting 
After Vishal was confirmed as the lead actor in the film, Thiru and Vishal were looking for three actresses to play the lead female roles. Several actresses including Bipasha Basu, Reemma Sen, Priyamani, Tamannaah Bhatia and Shriya Saran were approached or even confirmed, before ultimately opting out again. Finally, Bollywood actress Neetu Chandra, who starred in the horror film Yavarum Nalam opposite Madhavan and another Bollywood actress Tanushree Dutta, a former Miss India Universe, making her debut in the Tamil film industry, were confirmed for the roles. For the third female role, a newcomer Sarah-Jane Dias, a former Miss India World, was signed. Additionally, reports claimed that the film would also have two lead actresses appearing in guest roles as well. In December 2009, Sneha was roped in to appear in one of the two cameo roles, whilst the other actress' identity was not revealed until the film's release.

Filming 
The shooting started on 3 August and was held in several locations as Chennai, Hyderabad, the Maldives and Kochi. The title song of the film was shot in Mumbai at sets and choreographed by Bosco-Caesar, a popular choreographer duo that has worked for over 300 films in Bollywood, made their debut in Tamil with this film. For the same song, which was picturized in Vishal and the three leading actresses, Neetu Chandra is said to have soaked in a bathtub full of red chillies, which is considered one of the highlights of the entire film. Other songs were filmed in Australia and New Zealand. Furthermore, other songs were shot across Australia, in both urban and natural backgrounds.

Music 

Film score and soundtrack are composed by Yuvan Shankar Raja. The album was released on 16 December 2009 at Devi Theatres which Sify called the "grandest affair of the season". Initially actors Kamal Haasan and Rajinikanth were said to the chief guests of the function, which, however, turned out to be untrue.

The album features five songs plus one introduction track by composer Yuvan Shankar Raja, while an additional song, not included in the soundtrack release, featured in the film as part of the film score. Lyrics were penned by Pa. Vijay and Vaali.

Not in the soundtrack

Other music featured in the film includes:

 Theriyamale, composed and performed by Yuvan Shankar Raja

Reception 
The film received mixed reviews from the audience and critics, with the audience feeling that the combination of the three separate stories in the movie was well thought. Santhanam's comedy track was well appreciated in the movie. Sify Movies gave the movie a more lenient review,.

References

External links 
 

2010 films
2010 romantic comedy films
Films directed by Thiru (director)
Films scored by Yuvan Shankar Raja
2010s Tamil-language films
Indian romantic comedy films
Films shot in Chennai
Films shot in Kochi
Films shot in Hyderabad, India
Films shot in the Maldives
Films shot in Australia
Films shot in New Zealand
2010 directorial debut films